Kao Kuo-ching (born 6 October 1978) is a Taiwanese first baseman for the Uni-President Lions of the Chinese Professional Baseball League (CPBL). He is also the Lions' captain since the season of 2007. He has also played for the Taiwan national baseball team in 2008 Final Olympic Qualifying Tournament.

He refused to sign a long-term contract with Uni-President Lions, having the confidence that he will perform better next season.

Before 2013 season, he claimed that he did not regret about not signing a long-term with Uni-President Lions last season.

Career statistics

See also
 Chinese Professional Baseball League
 Uni-President Lions

References 

1978 births
2009 World Baseball Classic players
Living people
People from Taitung County
Uni-President 7-Eleven Lions players